Wisk'achani (Aymara wisk'acha a rodent,-ni a suffix, "the one with the viscacha", also spelled Viscachani) is a  mountain in the Bolivian Andes. It is located in the Cochabamba Department, Quillacollo Province, Sipe Sipe Municipality. Wisk'achani lies northwest of Inka Laqaya.

References 

Mountains of Cochabamba Department